Johann Gottlob Immanuel Breitkopf (Leipzig, 23 November 1719 – 28 January 1794, Leipzig) was a German music publisher and typographer.

Biography
Breitkopf was the son of the publisher Bernhard Christoph Breitkopf, founder of the publishing house Breitkopf & Härtel. He was born in Leipzig and attended the University of Leipzig.  His investigations in history and mathematics led him to a scientific study of printing, which resulted in a more artistic development of German text, and an improvement of musical notation (1754).  He revolutionized the music score printing with movable types, and fonts designed as Breitkopf Fraktur.

References

External links 
 

German typographers and type designers
1719 births
1794 deaths
Businesspeople from Leipzig
Leipzig University alumni
German publishers (people)